Badnjak or budnik may refer to:

Badnjak (Serbian)
Badnjak (Croatian)
Budnik (Bulgarian)
Budnik (hamlet), hamlet in Pskov Oblast

da:Split (flertydig)
de:Split (Begriffsklärung)
es:Split (desambiguación)
hr:badnjak
ja:スプリット
pl:Split
pt:Split (desambiguação)
ru:Сплит